Melanophryniscus rubriventris is a species of toad in the family Bufonidae.
It is found in Argentina and Bolivia.
Its natural habitats are subtropical or tropical dry forests, subtropical or tropical moist montane forests, rivers, rural gardens, heavily degraded former forest, and canals and ditches.

References

rubriventris
Amphibians described in 1947
Taxonomy articles created by Polbot